Mystic Lake is a seasonal lake in the San Jacinto Valley of western Riverside County, California. The lake's size can vary widely each year. At times the lake will persist from one year to the next, and at other times it will completely dissipate during the dry season. The Mystic Lake area attracts one of the most diverse populations of birds in the United States, with over 200 species identified.

The lake is located east of the Lake Perris reservoir and the town of Lakeview, between the cities of Moreno Valley, to the north, and San Jacinto, to the south. The town of Lakeview received its name for its proximity to Mystic Lake.

Shrinking

The lake lies within the outlet area of the San Jacinto River and is typically full only during late winter and spring when the river is flowing. In recent years, the lake has decreased from thousands of acres to under . If dry conditions persist, experts speculate that it will dry up altogether, becoming an ephemeral lake.

This is a part of a cycle of flooding and receding that the lake has gone through over hundreds and thousands of years. But it is very full of water and wildlife to date as of, April 2019.

Because the San Jacinto basin is actively and rapidly subsiding (on a geologic time-scale), the USGS estimates that the potential size of the lake (the rapidly expanding closed depression) will continue to grow.

Juan Bautista de Anza Anza Trail
The Anza Trail passes by the lake, which was described by Juan Bautista de Anza in 1774 as "several leagues in circumference and as full of white geese as water." Anza named it Laguna de Bucareli, after Antonio María de Bucareli y Ursúa, the viceroy of New Spain.  Much later, it became known as Mystic Lake.

San Jacinto Wildlife Area
The lake is adjacent to the 9,000–acre San Jacinto Wildlife Area, which is owned and managed by the California Department of Fish and Wildlife and open to the public. It features restored wetlands and wildlife habitat. Mystic Lake is a high priority acquisition area for the Department to add to the Wildlife Area.  It is a popular destination for bird-watchers and hunters.

See also
Juan Bautista de Anza National Historic Trail - National Park Service
List of lakes in California

References

External links
San Jacinto Wildlife Area website
National Park Service: Juan Bautista de Anza National Historic Trail
Anza Trail Historic Sites in California

Lakes of Riverside County, California
Santa Ana River
San Jacinto River (California)
Perris, California
Lakes of California
Lakes of Southern California
Bird sanctuaries of the United States